The West Branch (or West Fork) Feather River is a Lake Oroville tributary that flows generally north-to-south in the North Fork Feather Watershed near the watershed's drainage divide with the Mills-Big Chico Watershed and Upper Butte Watershed.

References

Tributaries of the Feather River
Rivers of Plumas County, California
Rivers of Northern California